This is a list of diseases starting with the letter "F".

Fa

Fab
 Fabry's disease

Fac

Face–Faci
 Faces syndrome
 Facial asymmetry temporal seizures
 Facial clefting corpus callosum agenesis
 Facial cleft
 Facial dysmorphism macrocephaly myopia Dandy–Walker type
 Facial dysmorphism shawl scrotum joint laxity syndrome
 Facial femoral syndrome
 Facial paralysis
 Facies unusual arthrogryposis advanced skeletal malformations
 Facio digito genital syndrome recessive form
 Facio skeletal genital syndrome Rippberger type
 Facio thoraco genital syndrome
 Faciocardiomelic dysplasia lethal
 Faciocardiorenal syndrome
 Faciooculoacousticorenal syndrome
 Facioscapulohumeral muscular dystrophy

Fact
 Factor II deficiency
 Factor V deficiency
 Factor V Leiden mutation
 Factor VII deficiency
 Factor VIII deficiency
 Factor X deficiency, congenital
 Factor X deficiency
 Factor XI deficiency, congenital
 Factor XIII deficiency, congenital
 Factor XIII deficiency

Fah–Fal
 Fahr's disease
 Fairbank disease
 Fallot tetralogy

Fam

Fami

Famil

Famili
Familial a – Familial i
 Familial ALS
 Familial ALS with dementia
 Familial adenomatous polyposis
 Familial amyloid polyneuropathy
 Familial aortic dissection
 Familial band heterotopia
 Familial cold autoinflamatory syndrome (FCAS)
 Familial colorectal cancer
 Familial deafness
 Familial dilated cardiomyopathy
 Familial dysautonomia
 Familial emphysema
 Familial eosinophilia
 Familial hyperchylomicronemia
 Familial hyperlipoproteinemia type I
 Familial hyperlipoproteinemia type III
 Familial hyperlipoproteinemia type IV
 Familial hyperlipoproteinemia
 Familial hypersensitivity pneumonitis
 Familial hypertension
 Familial hypopituitarism
 Familial hypothyroidism
 Familial intestinal polyatresia syndrome
Familial m – Familial w
 Familial Mediterranean fever
 Familial multiple lipomatosis
 Familial multiple trichodiscomas
 Familial myelofibrosis
 Familial nasal acilia
 Familial non-immune hyperthyroidism
 Familial opposable triphalangeal thumbs duplication
 Familial partial epilepsy with variable focus
 Familial periodic paralysis
 Familial polyposis
 Familial porencephaly
 Familial supernumerary nipples
 Familial symmetric lipomatosis
 Familial Treacher–Collins syndrome
 Familial veinous malformations
 Familial ventricular tachycardia
 Familial visceral myopathy
 Familial wilms tumor 2

Fan–Faz
 Fan death
 Fanconi anemia type 1
 Fanconi anemia type 2
 Fanconi anemia type 3
 Fanconi–Bickel syndrome
 Fanconi ichthyosis dysmorphism
 Fanconi like syndrome
 Fanconi pancytopenia
 Fanconi syndrome
 Fanconi syndrome, renal, with nephrocalcinosis and renal stones
 Fanconi anemia
 Fara–Chlupackova syndrome
 Farber's disease
 Farmer's lung
 Fas deficiency
 Fascioliasis
 Fatal familial insomnia
 Fatty liver
 Faulk–Epstein–Jones syndrome
 Faye–Petersen–Ward–Carey syndrome
 Fazio–Londe syndrome

Fe

Fea–Fer
 Fealty syndrome
 Febrile seizure
 Fechtner syndrome
 Feigenbaum–Bergeron–Richardson syndrome
 Feigenbaum–Bergeron syndrome
 Feingold syndrome
 Felty's syndrome
 Female pseudohermaphrodism Genuardi type
 Female pseudohermaphroditism
 Female sexual arousal disorder
 Femoral facial syndrome
 Femur bifid with monodactylous ectrodactyly
 Femur fibula ulna syndrome
 Fenton–Wilkinson–Toselano syndrome
 Ferlini–Ragno–Calzolari syndrome
 Fernhoff–Blackston–Oakley syndrome
 Ferrocalcinosis cerebro vascular

Fet
 Fetal acitretin syndrome
 Fetal akinesia syndrome X linked
 Fetal alcohol syndrome
 Fetal aminopterin syndrome
 Fetal and neonatal alloimmune thrombocytopenia
 Fetal antihypertensive drugs syndrome
 Fetal brain disruption sequence
 Fetal cytomegalovirus syndrome
 Fetal diethylstilbestrol syndrome
 Fetal edema
 Fetal enterovirus syndrome
 Fetal hydantoin syndrome
 Fetal indomethacin syndrome
 Fetal iodine syndrome
 Fetal left ventricular aneurysm
 Fetal methimazole syndrome
 Fetal methyl mercury syndrome
 Fetal minoxidil syndrome
 Fetal parainfluenza virus type 3 syndrome
 Fetal parvovirus syndrome
 Fetal phenothiazine syndrome
 Fetal prostaglandin syndrome
 Fetal thalidomide syndrome
 Fetal warfarin syndrome

Fg
 FG syndrome

Fi

Fib–Fil
 Fiber type disproportion, congenital
 Fibrinogen deficiency, congenital
 Fibrochondrogenesis
 Fibrolipomatosis
 Fibroma
 Fibromatosis gingival hypertrichosis
 Fibromatosis multiple non ossifying
 Fibromatosis
 Fibromuscular dysplasia of arteries
 Fibromuscular dysplasia
 Fibromyalgia
 Fibrosarcoma
 Idiopathic pulmonary fibrosis
 Fibrosing mediastinitis
 Fibrosis
 Fibrous dysplasia of bone
 Fibrous dysplasia
 Fibrodysplasia ossificans progressiva
 Fibula aplasia complex brachydactyly
 Fibular aplasia ectrodactyly
 Fibular hypoplasia femoral bowing oligodactyly
 Fibular hypoplasia scapulo pelvic dysplasia absent
 Fifth disease
 Filariasis
 Filippi syndrome

Fin–Fit
 Fine–Lubinsky syndrome
 Fingerprints absence syndactyly milia
 Finnish lethal neonatal metabolic syndrome
 Finnish type amyloidosis
 Finucane–Kurtz–Scott syndrome
 Fish poisoning
 Fish-eye disease
 Fissured tongue
 Fistulous vegetative verrucous hydradenoma
 Fitz-Hugh–Curtis syndrome
 Fitzsimmons–Walson–Mellor syndrome
 Fitzsimmons–Guilbert syndrome
 Fitzsimmons–McLachlan–Gilbert syndrome

Fl
 Flavimonas oryzihabitans
 Flesh eating bacteria
 Floaters
 Floating limb syndrome
 Floating-Harbor syndrome
 Florid cystic endosalpingiosis of the uterus
 Flotch syndrome
 Fluorosis
 Flynn–Aird syndrome

Fo
 Focal agyria pachygyria
 Focal alopecia congenital megalencephaly
 Focal dermal hypoplasia
 Focal dystonia
 Focal facial dermal dysplasia
 Focal or multifocal malformations in neuronal migration
 Foix–Chavany–Marie syndrome
 Foix–Alajouanine syndrome
 Follicular atrophoderma-basal cell carcinoma
 Follicular dendritic cell tumor
 Follicular hamartoma alopecia cystic fibrosis
 Follicular ichthyosis
 Follicular lymphoma
 Follicular lymphoreticuloma
 Fontaine–Farriaux–Blanckaert syndrome
 Forbes–Albright syndrome
 Forbes disease
 Foreign accent syndrome
 Forestier's disease
 Formaldehyde poisoning
 Forney–Robinson–Pascoe syndrome
 Fountain syndrome
 Fournier gangrene
 Fowler–Christmas–Chapele syndrome
 Fowler's syndrome
 Fox–Fordyce disease

Fr

Fra
 Fragile X syndrome
 Fragile X syndrome type 1
 Fragile X syndrome type 2
 Fragile X syndrome type 3
 Fragoso–Cid–Garcia–Hernandez syndrome
 Franceschetti–Klein syndrome
 Francheschini–Vardeu–Guala syndrome
 Francois dyscephalic syndrome
 Franek–Bocker–Kahlen syndrome
 Fraser–Jequier–Chen syndrome
 Fraser-like syndrome
 Fraser syndrome
 Frasier syndrome
 FRAXA syndrome
 FRAXD
 FRAXE syndrome

Fre–Fri
 Free sialic acid storage disease
 Freeman–Sheldon syndrome
 Freiberg's disease
 Freire–Maia odontotrichomelic syndrome
 Freire–Maia–Pinheiro–Opitz syndrome
 Frenkel–Russe syndrome
 Frey's syndrome
 Frias syndrome
 Fried–Goldberg–Mundel syndrome
 Friedel–Heid–Grosshans syndrome
 Friedman–Goodman syndrome
 Friedreich ataxia congenital glaucoma
 Friedreich's ataxia

Fro–Fru
 Froelich's syndrome
 Frölich's syndrome
 Fronto nasal malformation cloacal exstrophy
 Frontofacionasal dysplasia type Al gazali
 Fronto-facio-nasal dysplasia
 Frontometaphyseal dysplasia
 Frontonasal dysplasia acromelic
 Frontonasal dysplasia Klippel–Feil syndrome
 Frontonasal dysplasia phocomelic upper limbs
 Frontonasal dysplasia
 Frontotemporal dementia
 Froster–Huch syndrome
 Froster–Iskenius–Waterson syndrome
 Fructose intolerance
 Fructose-1,6-bisphosphatase deficiency
 Fructose-1-phosphate aldolase deficiency, heredita
 Fructosemia, hereditary
 Fructosuria

Fry
 Frydman–Cohen–Ashenazi syndrome
 Frydman–Cohen–Karmon syndrome
 Fryer syndrome
 Fryns–Fabry–Remans syndrome
 Fryns–Hofkens–Fabry syndrome
 Fryns–Smeets–Thiry syndrome

Fu
 Fucosidosis type 1
 Fucosidosis
 Fugue state
 Fuhrmann–Rieger–De Sousa syndrome
 Fukuda–Miyanomae–Nakata syndrome
 Fukuyama-type muscular dystrophy
 Fumarase deficiency
 Fumaric aciduria
 Functioning pancreatic endocrine tumor
 Fuqua–Berkovitz syndrome
 Furlong–Kurczynski–Hennessy syndrome
 Furukawa–Takagi–Nakao syndrome
 Furunculous myiasis
 Fused mandibular incisors

F